"Wicked" is a hip hop  single by American rapper Future. It was released on April 13, 2016, as the first single from his sixteenth mixtape Purple Reign (2016). The song was also  included on the streaming version of EVOL. The song samples "Kanet Rohi" written by Özcan Deniz, and performed by Rayan.

Release
On January 17, 2016, Future premiered his thirteenth mixtape Purple Reign, which included "Wicked" as the third track. On April 13, 2016, "Wicked" was released for digital download as a single on the iTunes Store, becoming the mixtape's first single. The song was included on the streaming version of Future's fourth studio album, EVOL, which was released on in February 2016.

Music video
The music video for "Wicked", directed by Grant Singer, premiered via Apple Music on June 3, 2016. It was uploaded to Future's Vevo channel on September 1, 2016.

Live performances
Future appeared on the Late Night with Jimmy Fallon on April 14, 2016, performing "Wicked". On June 26, 2016, he performed the song at the BET Awards. The song was also included on the set list for Future and Drake's 2016 Summer Sixteen Tour.

Remixes and usage in the media
In April 2016, rappers Fabolous and Jadakiss released their collaborative remix of "Wicked". On June 12, 2016, the song was playing during the Orlando nightclub shooting.

Track listing

Commercial performance
"Wicked" debuted at number 73 on the Billboard Hot 100, and later reached at number 41 on the chart.

Charts

Charts

Year-end charts

Certifications

Release history

References

External links

2016 singles
2016 songs
Future (rapper) songs
Epic Records singles
Songs written by Future (rapper)
Songs written by Metro Boomin
Song recordings produced by Metro Boomin
Songs written by Southside (record producer)